Roger Guerreiro (born on 25 May 1982), commonly known as Roger,  is a Polish former footballer who last played for Rio Verde as an attacking midfielder. Brazilian-born Roger was granted Polish citizenship.

Club career

AEK Athens 
On 27 August 2009, Guerreiro signed a four-year contract with AEK Athens F.C. Guerreiro was the second Brazilian in the team, the other was Leonardo.

Guerreiro made his debut for AEK versus Iraklis on 13 September 2009.

Guerreiro was a regular for AEK until he fell out of favor with coach Dušan Bajević and was not included in any squads. In the transfer period, Guerreiro was for sale and was offered to many European clubs. After the transfer period ended, Guerreiro apologized to Bajevic and was given another chance and is now a member of the squad. Guerreiro's first match of the 2010–11 season was an away game against Aris, the match ended 0–4 to AEK Athens.

Guerreiro scored his first goal for AEK against Atromitos scoring the only goal of the match giving AEK the 1–0 win. His contract ended in 2013 and did not get renewed.

International career
He was granted Polish citizenship on 17 April 2008.
Roger received the citizenship in a speedy procedure, and was guaranteed a place in the Poland's football team for the 2008 European Championships (coached by Leo Beenhakker). He made his debut in a Poland shirt in the game versus Albania on 27 May 2008.

Euro 2008
On 12 June, he scored his first goal for the Poland national team with a 30th-minute shot against Austria in both teams' second Group B match of Euro 2008. For this game, UEFA awarded him man of the match. It was Poland's first-ever goal in the European Championship.

Statistics

Career total

Honours

Legia Warsaw
Ekstraklasa: 2005–06
Polish SuperCup: 2008
Polish Cup: 2008

AEK Athens
Greek Cup: 2010–11

References

External links
 
 Player website
 
 
 
 PZPN.pl profile 
 Player profile on Polish SOCA! 
 thinkball.com profile

Living people
1982 births
Polish people of Brazilian descent
Brazilian emigrants to Poland
Naturalized citizens of Poland
Footballers from São Paulo
Association football midfielders
Polish footballers
Brazilian footballers
Poland international footballers
UEFA Euro 2008 players
Associação Desportiva São Caetano players
Sport Club Corinthians Paulista players
CR Flamengo footballers
Esporte Clube Juventude players
RC Celta de Vigo players
Legia Warsaw players
AEK Athens F.C. players
Guaratinguetá Futebol players
Comercial Futebol Clube (Ribeirão Preto) players
Rio Branco Sport Club players
Aris Limassol FC players
Villa Nova Atlético Clube players
Hercílio Luz Futebol Clube players
Esporte Clube Rio Verde players
Campeonato Brasileiro Série A players
Segunda División players
Ekstraklasa players
Super League Greece players
Cypriot First Division players
Polish expatriate footballers
Polish expatriate sportspeople in Spain
Polish expatriate sportspeople in Greece
Polish expatriate sportspeople in Cyprus
Brazilian expatriate footballers
Brazilian expatriate sportspeople in Spain
Brazilian expatriate sportspeople in Greece
Brazilian expatriate sportspeople in Cyprus
Expatriate footballers in Spain
Expatriate footballers in Greece
Expatriate footballers in Cyprus